Rick Judson (born August 13, 1969) is an American former professional ice hockey player.

Judson played college hockey at the University of Illinois at Chicago, then went on to play for and additional fifteen seasons in the minor leagues before retiring as a professional player in 2006.

Career statistics

References
 https://www.eliteprospects.com/player/71460/rick-judson

1969 births
Living people
Adirondack Red Wings players
American ice hockey left wingers
Detroit Red Wings draft picks
Fort Wayne Komets players
Greenville Grrrowl players
Las Vegas Thunder players
Manchester Storm (1995–2002) players
Kalamazoo Wings (1974–2000) players
Minnesota Moose players
Port Huron Border Cats players
Sportspeople from Toledo, Ohio
Ice hockey players from Ohio
Toledo Storm players
UIC Flames men's ice hockey players
Utah Grizzlies (IHL) players